The High Energy Physics Advisory Panel (HEPAP) is a permanent advisory committee to the United States Department of Energy and the National Academy of Sciences, created in 1967 and organized under the Federal Advisory Committee Act (FACA) of 1972.

Under the FACA, the High Energy Physics Advisory Panel meets in public, and subpanels are appointed to meet and deliberate in private. In high-energy physics, peer review groups of scientists, knowledgeable in their fields, are asked to sit on these subpanels, and to make recommendations about future high energy physics. HEPAP either accepts or rejects panels’ recommendations, and the Department of Energy decides which projects to support in turn.

The Particle Physics Project Prioritization Panel, a subcommittee of HEPAP, produces periodic reports outlining funding priorities for particle physics investments by the United States. The next P5 panel is scheduled to be convened in Spring 2023.

References

Scientific funding advisory bodies
Physics organizations
Experimental particle physics
United States Department of Energy
National Science Foundation